Manuel Ngalula Sallo da Cunha (born 17 May 1996), commonly known as Lulas, is an Angolan footballer who currently plays as a defender for Sagrada Esperança.

Career statistics

Club

Notes

International

References

1996 births
Living people
Angolan footballers
Angola international footballers
Association football defenders
G.D. Sagrada Esperança players
Girabola players
Angola A' international footballers
2022 African Nations Championship players